Nasty is a hamlet in the East Hertfordshire district of Hertfordshire, England. It is in Great Munden civil parish, around 6 miles (10 km) north of Ware and around 7.5 miles (12 km) east of Stevenage. At the 2011 census the population was included in the civil parish of Albury.

Its name comes from the Anglo-Saxon æt þǽm éastan hæge, meaning "at the eastern hedged enclosure" or similar.

External links

Great Munden (A Guide to Old Hertfordshire)
Google Earth view with the name on a road sign

Hamlets in Hertfordshire
East Hertfordshire District